Belosaepiidae is an extinct family of cephalopods known from the Eocene epoch, and bearing close similarity to the sepiid cuttlefish, whilst retaining the remnants of a belemnite-like guard. It is thought that this species was most common for its time.

Seagrass Importance To Belosaepiidae
A faunal collection has been found that contains Belosaepiidae and Sepiidae, suggesting that they are likely to have originated from a seagrass environment in the past. As there was a lack of seagrass overtime in the North Atlantic during the late Eocene period, a particular species called belosaepiid went extinct within the family belosipiidae.

References

Eocene molluscs